Rhys Muldoon (born 17 October 1965) is an Australian actor, writer and director who has worked extensively in film, television, music, theatre and radio. Since 2012 he has starred as Mark Oliver in House Husbands.

Career
Muldoon has starred in numerous television roles including Farscape,  Dead Lucky, Rake, Secret River, Childhood's End, Offspring, Jack Irish, Miss Fisher's Murder Mysteries, Bastard Boys, House Husbands, Play School and the high rating Dr Bogle and Mrs Chandler, the BAFTA nominated Lockie Leonard based on the books by Australian writer Tim Winton, Blackjack with Colin Friels, the multiple AFI award-winning Grass Roots (series 1 and 2) as the scheming general manager, Greg Dominelli, Secret Life of Us, Big Sky, and The Genie From Down Under. He featured regularly on the ABC news and current affairs programs The Drum and on Sky News. He is currently filming The Killing Season for Foxtel and Dead Lucky for SBS/Netflix.

In film, Muldoon has appeared in the Oscar-nominated film The Saviour (2006), Ladykiller (1993), Gristle (1998), Mumbo Jumbo (1999), Danny Deckchair (2003), The Crop (2004), Second Chance (2005), The Extra (2005), Valentine's Day (2007), the hit of the 2008 Tribeca Film Festival, Bitter & Twisted and Steven Soderbergh's "Secret Film Project" (2010). In 2019, Muldoon appeared as Craig in the teen movie "Bilched" written by Hal Cumpston, that won Grand Prix Feature Film at the Chelsea Film Festival.

Filmography

Television
 The Drum (TV program)
 Acropolis Now (1991) (1 episode) - Uri
 Chances (1991) - Ben Taylor 
 Time Trax (1993) (1 episode) - Lawyer Fox
 G.P. (1993) (1 episode) - Reverend Tom Braithwaite
 Funky Squad (1995) (1 episode) - Ashley 
 Snowy River: The Macgregor Saga (1995) (1 episode) - Constable Edward Dengate
 Us & Them (1995) (13 episodes) - Nick Fraser
 The Genie From Down Under (1995-98) - Bruce the Genie
 Blue Heelers (1996-2001) - Simon Winter/ Geoff Grimshaw
 Big Sky (1997-99) - Jimbo James
 Driven Crazy (1998) (1 episode) - McAvity
 The Silver Brumby (1998) (1 episode) - Arrow (voice)
 Stingers (1999) (1 episode) - Jimi Mercer 
 Farscape (1999) (1 episode) - Staanz
 Water Rats (2000) (1 episode) - John Wade
 Grass Roots (2000-03) - Greg Dominelli
 Play School (2000-12) - Presenter
 The Lost World (2001) (1 episode) - Blum
 Young Lions (miniseries) (2002) - Justice Paul Bergan
 Secret Life of Us (2003-05) - Frank Goodman
 McLeod's Daughters (2005) (2 episodes) - Jeremy Quaid
 headLand (2006) (2 episodes) - Alistair Grey
 Lockie Leonard (2007-10) - Sarge Leonard / Neville
 Blackjack: Ghosts (TV movie) (2007) - Dave Halfpenny
 Bastard Boys (miniseries) (2007) - Julian BurnsIde, QC
 Doing Dungog (documentary) (2008) - Self
 City Homicide (2009) (1 episode) - Dr Lance Turner
 Rake (2010-16) (8 episodes) - Lincoln Lincoln
 House Husbands (2012-17) - Mark Oliver
 Miss Fisher's Murder Mysteries (2013) (1 episode) - Clarence Ball
 Offspring (2014) (1 episode) - Scott
 The Secret River (miniseries) (2015) - Lord Loveday
 Childhood's End (2015) (1 episode) - Presenter
 Dead Lucky (miniseries) (2018) - Richard
 Fighting Season (miniseries) (2018) - Colonel Floss
 Les Norton (miniseries) (2019) - The Minister
 Total Control (2019) (1 episode) - Interviewer
 Informer 3838 (miniseries) (2020) (2 episodes) - Terrence Hodson
 New Gold Mountain (miniseries) (2021) - Commissioner Wright

Films
 The Great Air Race (1991) - Jimmy Melrose
 Ladykiller (1993) - Chris
 Mumbo Jumbo (TV movie) (1999) - Hugo 
 Danny Deckchair (2003) - Sandy Upman
 Second Chance (TV movie) (2005) - Lloyd Regalton
 The Extra (2005) - Curtis Thai-Duckworth
 The Crop (2004) - Wack
 Who Killed Dr Bogle and Mrs Chandler? (TV movie) (2006) - Dr Bogle
 Valentine's Day (2007) - Ben Valentine
 Emerald Falls (2008) - Paul Ferguson
 Bitter & Twisted (2008) - Donald 
 Infamous Victory: Ben Chifley's Battle for Coal (TV movie) (2008) - Edgar Ross
 Possessions(s) (TV movie) (2010) - Narrator
 The Last Time I Saw Michael Gregg (2011) - Ned
 33 Postcards (2011) - Gary
 The Sapphires (2012) - Uncle Ed
 Jack Irish (TV movie: Black Tide) (2012) - Rod Pringle
 Jack Irish (TV movie: Bad Debts) (2012) - Rod Pringle
 Utopia (documentary film) (2012) - Fraser
 Love is Now (2014) - Constable Stern
 The HR Guy (2014) - Mr Phil Dawson
 Sweatshop (TV movie) (2015) - Roger Silver
 Chasing Comets (2018) - Warren Low
 Book Week (2018) - Blake Woodriff
 Bilched (2019) - Craig
 Interceptor (2022) - Lieutenant Colonel Clark Marshall

Shorts
 Midday Crisis (1994) - Ed Ditma
 Gristle (1998) - Doug
 The Saviour (2006) - Tony
 Ralph (2009) - Teacher #1
 Tinman (2011) - Greg
 Waiting for the Turning of the Earth (2011) - Eric
 Waiting for Robbo (2011) - Robbo
 The Fragments (2013) - Peter
 Foreign Body (2017) - Geoff
 Lovelost (2018) - Man (voice)

Theatre
Muldoon has appeared in productions of Steven Soderbergh's Tot Mom for the Sydney Theatre Company (2009/10), Gethsemane by David Hare for Belvoir St Theatre (2009).  Muldoon starred as British Prime Minister Tony Blair in the play Stuff Happens by David Hare in Sydney and Melbourne. In 2005, he was Cooley in Don's Party in 2006/7 for the MTC/STC. He starred in Decadence by Steven Berkoff, as Mozart in a production of Amadeus, as Mercutio in Romeo and Juliet and as Demetrius in A Midsummer Night's Dream. In 2018, he will be playing Sir Isaac Newton in "Nearer the Gods" for Queensland Theatre

Music
Muldoon has released 2 albums of Children's music through ABC Music; 'I'm Not Singing' (2011), and 'Perfect Is the Enemy of Good''', (2015). Both albums were co-written and produced by Kram (Spiderbait), and nominated for ARIA Awards.

Radio
Muldoon has worked on many radio stations, including MMM, Fox, NOVA in Melbourne, Sydney and Canberra, as well as ABC national and local radio.

Writing
He has written for various publications, including The Monthly, The Spectator, The Sydney Morning Herald, The Age, Jewish News, and Inside Football, where he has had a regular column for a number of years. His essay "A Coup by Any Other Name" for The Monthly, about the removal of Kevin Rudd as Prime Minister was named "an essay of the year". He has also written (with his daughter, Lotte Muldoon) a book on Henri de Toulouse-Lautrec for the National Gallery of Australia. He has collaborated on a children's book Jasper & Abby and the Great Australia Day Kerfuffle with former Australian Prime Minister, Kevin Rudd. He co-wrote (with Wayne Blair) an episode of Lockie Leonard ("Time and Tide"). 
He has also written many speeches for politicians, CEO's, journalists and businesspeople.

Personal life
Muldoon grew up in Canberra, attending Scullin Primary School, Belconnen High School and Hawker College. He graduated from the Victorian College of the Arts in 1989.

Muldoon supports the St Kilda Football Club in the Australian Football League.

Awards and nominations
1991 Green Room Award nomination for 3 Guys Naked From the Waist Down1995 Melbourne International Comedy Festival Award for Best Actor – Decadence1995 Green Room Award Nomination Best Actor for Decadence1997 Best Actor Award Short Film and Video Awards
2000 AFI Award nomination for Best Actor in a Leading Role, TV Drama series for Grass Roots2010 AACTA Nomination for Best Actor in a Leading Role for Lockie Leonard
2012 ARIA Music Awards nomination for Best Children's Album for I'm Not Singing2015 ARIA Music Awards nomination for Best Children's Album for Perfect Is The Enemy of Good''

References

External links

Greg Dominelli/Rhys bio on Grassroots website
http://www.nedkellyawards.com
Jasper + Abby and the Great Australia Day Kerfuffle
Rhys Muldoon on Twitter

1965 births
Living people
Australian radio personalities
Australian male film actors
Australian male television actors
People from Newcastle, New South Wales
People from Canberra
Australian children's television presenters
People educated at Hawker College